The sixth All-Africa Games were held in September 1995 in Harare, Zimbabwe. As the track is at an altitude of 1473 metres all performances are considered to be set at altitude, this is believed to assist events up to 400 metres and in the long jump and triple jump. However, for events beyond 800 metres the thinner air is believed to have a detrimental effect on performances.

Medal summary

Men's events

Women's events

Medal table

References
GBR Athletics

 
Athletics
1995
All-Africa Games
1995 in Zimbabwean sport
International sports competitions hosted by Zimbabwe